Kellen Boswell Winslow II (born July 21, 1983) is an American former professional football player and a convicted sex offender. He was a tight end in the National Football League (NFL) and played college football at the University of Miami, where he earned unanimous All-American honors, was recognized as the top college tight end and won the 2001 BCS national championship. Winslow was drafted by the Cleveland Browns with the sixth overall pick in the 2004 NFL Draft. Winslow played four seasons for the Browns and was named to the Pro Bowl in 2007. He also played for the Tampa Bay Buccaneers, New England Patriots and New York Jets.

Winslow last played in the NFL in 2013, but attempted comebacks in 2017 and 2018, before being convicted of rape and sexual battery in 2019.

Early years
Winslow was born in San Diego, California, the son of San Diego Chargers tight end Kellen Winslow, a member of the Pro Football Hall of Fame. He attended Patrick Henry High School, in San Diego, for his freshmen and sophomore years of high school and Scripps Ranch High School for his junior and senior years.

College career
Winslow enrolled at the University of Miami, where he played for coach Larry Coker's Miami Hurricanes football team from 2001 to 2003.

Freshman season
During his freshman season, he backed up All-American tight end Jeremy Shockey and played largely on special teams, and was one of four true freshmen to play during the Hurricanes' 2001 run to the BCS National Championship, the others being future NFL stars Frank Gore, Antrel Rolle, and Sean Taylor.

Sophomore season
After Shockey's departure for the 2002 NFL Draft, Winslow became the starter at tight end and was named a finalist for the Mackey Award and named a first-team All-American by CNNSI.com, setting Miami records for a tight end with 57 receptions for 726 yards and 8 touchdowns.  His best game came during the 2003 Fiesta Bowl, which was the site of the BCS National Championship game that year, in which Winslow caught 11 passes for 122 yards and one touchdown. The Hurricanes fell to the Ohio State Buckeyes, 31–24.

Junior season
Despite a slight drop in production during his junior season, in which Winslow caught 60 passes for 605 yards and 1 touchdown, he won the John Mackey Award as the nation's best collegiate tight end, and he was recognized as a unanimous first-team All-American, after receiving first-team honors from the Associated Press and other national selector organizations.  After the season, Winslow decided to forgo his senior season and declared himself eligible for the 2004 NFL Draft.

"I'm a Soldier" controversy
Winslow received national attention following a 2003 University of Miami game with the Tennessee Volunteers.  Eighteenth-ranked Tennessee defeated #6 Miami on the Hurricanes home field by a score of 10–6.   During a sweep play for Miami wide receiver/cornerback Devin Hester, Winslow blocked two Volunteers, effectively taking both defenders out of the play. When questioned during the media session following the game, Winslow referred to himself as "a  soldier", despite never serving in the military. He later apologized for the remarks that garnered national attention.

Professional career

Cleveland Browns
Winslow was drafted by the Cleveland Browns with the sixth pick in the first round of the 2004 NFL Draft, making him the highest-selected tight end in more than 30 years. Cleveland head coach Butch Davis was also the coach who recruited Winslow to the University of Miami before leaving for the NFL prior to ever coaching Winslow in college.

Winslow would eventually choose sports agents Carl and Kevin Poston of Professional Sports Planning Inc. (PSP) to represent him at the negotiating table. The Poston brothers - whose clients at the time also included Orlando Pace and Charles Woodson - seemed an odd choice. Although respected in many circles for their ability to secure hefty contracts for their clients, the pair had developed difficult working relationships with several teams, league executives, and the NFL Players' Association. In March 2006, Carl Poston was suspended for two years by the NFLPA disciplinary committee after admitting that he had not read the contract of Washington Redskins' linebacker LaVar Arrington, which did not include an agreed upon $6.5 million bonus. Eventually, the Postons secured a six-year $40 million deal for Winslow, including a $16.5 million signing bonus.

2004 leg injury
Winslow was expected to give the Cleveland offense an immediate boost. Two games into his rookie season, however, he suffered a broken right fibula, which cost him $5.3 million in incentive bonuses. The injury kept him on the sidelines for the remainder of the year after having only recorded five catches for 50 yards. After two operations on the injured leg, Winslow made a complete recovery.

2005 motorcycle accident
On May 1, 2005, Winslow suffered another leg injury when he was thrown from his Suzuki GSX-R750 motorcycle while riding in the Cleveland suburb of Westlake. Winslow sustained a torn anterior cruciate ligament in his right knee and was placed on the "Physically Unable-to-Perform (Non Football Injury)" list for the 2005 season. Winslow later had a six-week staph infection that resulted from the injury.

2006 season
Winslow attended the Browns' 2006 training camp and pronounced himself ready to play. The Associated Press reported in August 2006 that Winslow said that, even at 90 percent, he was superior to every other NFL tight end. "I hate to be brash", Winslow said. "But I think my 90 percent is still better than every tight end out there."

In the opening game of the 2006 NFL season against the New Orleans Saints, Winslow recorded his first NFL touchdown, scoring on an 18-yard pass from quarterback Charlie Frye. Winslow emerged as a reliable target for Cleveland, finishing the year with 89 receptions, the most at his position on the season, which also tied Ozzie Newsome's all-time franchise record for receptions in a season. Winslow underwent microfracture surgery on his right knee January 31, 2007, at the Cleveland Clinic in an attempt to further repair cartilage damage sustained in the motorcycle accident in 2005.

2007 season
Winslow had a successful season and finished with 82 receptions for 1,106 yards and five touchdowns. On December 18, Winslow was named as a first alternate for the 2008 Pro Bowl.  On February 4, Antonio Gates of the San Diego Chargers announced he would not be attending the Pro Bowl due to injury. This paved the way for Winslow to make his first trip to the Pro Bowl. Winslow was one of 6 Browns selected for the Pro Bowl that season.

The Browns also had their most successful season in recent memory. For the first time since 1994, Cleveland had double-digit wins with a 10–6 record. The Browns narrowly missed 2007–08 NFL playoffs and were the only 9+ win team not to qualify for the NFL's postseason tournament.

2008 season
During the 2008 season, Winslow was hospitalized with a staph infection. Winslow then openly criticized former GM Phil Savage about not fixing the infection problem (the Browns had seven cases of staph infection in the last few years), and trying to hide the injury. Savage responded by suspending him for a week; owner Randy Lerner later apologized to Winslow and rescinded the suspension.

Tampa Bay Buccaneers
Winslow was traded to the Tampa Bay Buccaneers on February 27, 2009, for their 2nd-round pick in the 2009 NFL Draft and their 5th-round pick in the 2010 NFL Draft. He received the biggest contract for a tight end in NFL history with a 6-year, $36 million deal.

2009 season
Winslow went on to a record-breaking season with the Buccaneers in his first year with the team, including single-season franchise records for a tight end in receptions (77) and receiving yards (884). His 77 catches led the team that season.

2010 season
In his second year with the Buccaneers, he led the team in receptions with 66, for 730 yards and scored 5 touchdowns. The Bucs finished 10–6 in a rugged NFC South that included the Atlanta Falcons, who finished 13–3, and the New Orleans Saints, who finished 11–5. The division was the only one in the NFL to have three teams post double-digit wins in 2010. However, the Bucs narrowly missed the 2010–11 NFL playoffs. The Green Bay Packers, who had an identical 10–6 record, went on to win the Super Bowl that year.

2011 season
Once again Winslow led the team in receptions in his third season with the Buccaneers, recording 75 receptions for 763 receiving yards and 2 touchdowns.

Despite a strong outing in 2010 and a strong start in 2011, the Bucs finished 4–12.

On May 21, 2012, Winslow announced that the Buccaneers had informed him that he would either be traded or released. It was also reported that Winslow had been directed not to attend organized team activities ('OTAs') while a trade was pursued, contradicting earlier reports that Winslow refused to participate in OTAs.

Seattle Seahawks
Winslow was traded to the Seattle Seahawks on May 22, 2012. On September 1, 2012, he was released by the Seahawks after declining to reduce his salary.

New England Patriots
Winslow signed with the New England Patriots on September 18, 2012. He then asked for his release and was granted it on September 27, 2012, after only playing in one game.

New York Jets
Winslow was invited to attend the New York Jets' mini-camp for a three-day tryout. Winslow subsequently signed a one-year contract on June 14, 2013, after general manager John Idzik and head coach Rex Ryan praised Winslow's performance. On October 11, 2013, Winslow was suspended for four games for violating the NFL's policy on performance-enhancing substances.

Comeback attempt
In 2016, Winslow attempted a comeback after sitting out for over two years. He had a workout with the Green Bay Packers in August but was not offered a contract. Winslow participated in The Spring League in 2017 and 2018.

NFL career statistics

Personal life
He was married on June 15, 2006, to Janelle Winslow. The couple welcomed their first son Jalen in February 2011, and a daughter, Juliana, in August 2013. In August 2019, Janelle filed for divorce citing irreconcilable differences.

On October 17, 2006, Kellen's half-brother Justin Winslow died, although no cause of death was reported; he was 23 years of age and was found unconscious by his mother. Kellen II and Justin are the only sons of Hall of Fame tight end Kellen Winslow.

Legal history
Winslow was charged with drug possession in January 2014
and received a conditional discharge without a guilty finding in the synthetic marijuana case.

On June 7, 2018, Winslow was arrested fleeing a mobile home park in Encinitas, California. He was charged with felony first degree burglary and held on $50,000 bond. Winslow was arrested on June 14, 2018, on charges of kidnapping and rape. In July, a judge ordered Winslow to stand trial for kidnapping and raping two women. Winslow was placed on house arrest with GPS monitoring after posting $2 million bail. In a separate case that month, he was also charged with raping an unconscious 17-year-old girl in 2003, when he was 19.

On March 4, 2019, Winslow's bail was revoked, and he was jailed after being arraigned on two new counts of lewd conduct, and one count each of battery of an elder and willful cruelty to an elder, all misdemeanors, that he allegedly committed in Carlsbad, California, in February 2019. He was convicted of rape, a lewd act in public conduct and indecent exposure on June 10, 2019. He was also acquitted on another lewd act in public charge, and the judge sent the jury back to consider verdicts on all of the other charges. The following day, a mistrial was declared on the remaining eight charges. Prosecutors announced on June 14 that Winslow would be retried on the eight charges, with his second trial set to begin on September 30.

On November 4, 2019, Winslow pleaded guilty to the rape of an unconscious teen and sexual battery on a 54-year-old hitchhiker as part of a plea deal. In exchange for his guilty plea at San Diego County Superior Court, the court agreed to sentence him to between 12 and 18 years in prison, rather than life imprisonment if he was convicted in the retrial.  As part of the agreement, he will automatically be on lifetime parole immediately upon release, and he waived his right to ever appeal any conviction or verdict in either trial. Winslow's defense attorney said that his client suffered from frontal lobe damage and possible chronic traumatic encephalopathy (CTE). While CTE could not be used as a defense in the trial, brain trauma was cited by his attorneys in requesting the minimum 12-year sentence. A clinical psychologist stated that Winslow had symptoms that were consistent with CTE. His sentencing was scheduled for March 18, 2020 but was postponed indefinitely due to concerns over the coronavirus. On February 19, 2021, Winslow agreed and accepted a 14-year prison sentence for one count of rape and two counts of assault, and was sentenced on March 3, 2021.

References

External links

 New York Jets bio 
 Miami Hurricanes bio
 ESPN Profile
 Kellen Winslow Official Website 

1983 births
21st-century American criminals
Living people
African-American players of American football
All-American college football players
American Conference Pro Bowl players
American football tight ends
American rapists
American people convicted of rape
American people convicted of sexual assault
American sportspeople convicted of crimes
Criminals from California
Miami Hurricanes football players
Players of American football from San Diego
Prisoners and detainees of California
Cleveland Browns players
Tampa Bay Buccaneers players
Seattle Seahawks players
New England Patriots players
New York Jets players
The Spring League players
21st-century African-American sportspeople
20th-century African-American people